Albert Power may refer to:

Albert Power (priest), Irish priest, academic, and author
Albert Power (sculptor), Irish artist